Horseshoe Baltimore is an urban two-story casino, and the second largest casino in Maryland with a 122,000-square-foot gaming floor. The multimillion-dollar facility features video lottery terminals, table games, and a World Series of Poker room. Horseshoe's 20,000-square-foot Baltimore Marketplace features Charm City food outlets, three premier restaurants, and several bars and lounges.

The $442-million worth casino is located along Russell Street on Baltimore’s south side, neighboring professional sports venues M&T Bank Stadium, home of the NFL Baltimore Ravens, and Camden Yards, home of the MLB Baltimore Orioles, as well as Baltimore’s Inner Harbor.

The casino is owned by CBAC Gaming, a group led by Caesars Entertainment, and is managed by Caesars. Other members of the CBAC consortium include Jack Entertainment; CVPR Gaming Holdings, LLC; STRON-MD Limited Partnership; and PRT TWO, LLC.

History
In a 2008 constitutional referendum, Maryland voters approved a video lottery terminal casino facility in Baltimore City, and at four other locations throughout the state. In July 2012, the Maryland Lottery Commission approved a Caesars Entertainment-led consortium bid to develop and operate a gaming facility in downtown Baltimore.

Initial designs of the casino were prepared by Baltimore-based architects Ayers Saint Gross. Following the construction approval, revised renderings were prepared by Cleveland-based KA architects, who designed the Horseshoe Casino Cleveland.

On August 26, 2014, the casino opened with a full night of celebration that included a performances inside and outside of the Casino. Outside entertainment included a live performance from Andy Kushner Entertainment's Rhythm6 band and vertical dance performances by BANDALOOP and pyrotechnics before doors opened to VIPs. Inside entertainment was provided by legendary Motown artist  Gladys Knight, with "break music" provided by Iggy Azalea and Pauly D.

In October 2018, the Horseshoe announced a multi-year marketing deal making it the official casino partner for the Baltimore Ravens.

Question Seven
In November 2012, after the most expensive political campaign in Maryland's history, voters approved a 6th casino license in the state, as well as the addition of table games at all Maryland casino sites. Voters approved the expansion of gambling, Question 7, with 52 percent of the vote. More than $90 million was spent between the two campaigns in their efforts to sway voters. Vote Yes on Question 7 was led by MGM Resorts International, The Peterson Cos. and labor organizations. Vote No On 7 was funded almost entirely by Penn National Gaming, owner of Hollywood Casino at Charles Town Races.

Transportation
Horseshoe Casino can be accessed by the Baltimore Light Rail at Hamburg Street Station, and by MTA Buses #73,#26,and #75

Criticism
Baltimore Brew has been critical of the city's financial support of the casino, including increased police presence near the casino and planned financial reimbursements, particularly after initial revenue from the casino has proven to be less than anticipated.

Horseshoe also faces a unique security challenge, because it holds a 24-7 liquor license at its 14forty bar. The only bars in Maryland that can serve alcohol around the clock are in casinos.

See also
List of casinos in Maryland

References

External links

2014 establishments in Maryland
Caesars Entertainment
Casinos completed in 2014
Casinos in Maryland
Rock Ventures
South Baltimore
Tourist attractions in Baltimore